Prostanthera cryptandroides is a species of flowering plant in the family Lamiaceae and is endemic to eastern Australia. It is a low, spreading shrub with narrow egg-shaped leaves and lilac to mauve flowers arranged singly in leaf axils.

Description
Prostanthera cryptandroides is a low, spreading, strongly aromatic shrub, the branches with spreading hairs as well as glandular hairs. The flowers are tube-shaped and arranged in upper leaf axils near the ends of branchlets. Flowering occurs from September to April.

Taxonomy
Prostanthera cryptandroides was first formally described in 1834 by George Bentham from an unpublished description by Allan Cunningham and the description was published in Bentham's book Labiatarum Genera et Species from specimens collected by Cunningham near the Hunter River.

In 1999, Barry Conn described two subspecies of P. cryptandroides in the journal Telopea and the names are accepted by the Australian Plant Census:
 Prostanthera cryptandroides A.Cunn. ex Benth. subsp. cryptandroides (commonly known as the Wollemi mint-bush) has branches and sepals without stalked glandular hairs;
 Prostanthera cryptandroides subsp. euphrasioides(Benth.) B.J.Conn has stalked glandular hairs on the branches and sepals.

Distribution and habitat
This mint bush grows in forest, often in rocky places and is found from the Leichhardt region of north Queensland to northern New South Wales. Wollemi mint-bush has a restricted distribution between the Lithgow and Sandy Hollow districts of New South Wales. Populations of subsp. cryptandroides occur within the Wollemi and Gardens of Stone National Parks.

Conservation status
Subspecies eudesmioides is classified as of "least concern" in Queensland. Subspecies cryptandroides is listed as "vulnerable" under the Australian Government Environment Protection and Biodiversity Conservation Act 1999 and the New South Wales Government Biodiversity Conservation Act 2016. The main threats to this subspecies are habitat loss, trampling and grazing, inappropriate fire regimes and weed invasion.

References

cryptandroides
Flora of New South Wales
Flora of Queensland
Lamiales of Australia
Plants described in 1834
Taxa named by Allan Cunningham (botanist)